Mehdiabad (also Romanized as Mehdīābād; also known as Tāzeh Kand) is a village in Alvandkuh-e Gharbi Rural District, in the Central District of Hamadan County, Hamadan Province, Iran. At the 2006 census, its population was 1,303, in 320 families.

References 

Populated places in Hamadan County